Centre Village is an unincorporated community in Howard County, Maryland, United States. A postal office operated from 7 November 1863 to 21 July 1864.

References

Unincorporated communities in Howard County, Maryland
Unincorporated communities in Maryland